Robert Bernard may refer to:
 Bob Bernard (1961–2007), American IT executive
 Sir Robert Bernard, 1st Baronet (1601–1666), English lawyer and politician
 Sir Robert Bernard, 3rd Baronet (died  1703), MP for Huntingdonshire and High Sheriff of Cambridgeshire and Huntingdonshire
 Sir Robert Bernard, 5th Baronet (c. 1740–1789), MP for Bedford and Westminster
 Robert Bernard (advocate-general) (c. 1808–1840), lawyer and parliamentarian in South Australia
 Robert James Bernard (1894–1981), American academic administrator and president of the Claremont Colleges
 Robert Bernard (footballer) (1913–1990), German footballer
 Rocky Bernard (born 1979), American football defensive tackle
 Robert Bernard Martin (1918–1999), American scholar and biographer who also wrote as Robert Bernard

See also
 
 Bernard baronets
 Bernard (surname)